Mayilam  or Mailam is a village near  Tindivanam and it is famous for the Mayilam Murugan Temple.

Mayilam is located fifteen kilometres from Tindivanam and thirty from Pondicherry. The temple, situated on a small hill, is connected with a village on the Coromandel coast, Bomayapalaiyam, very near Pondicherry, where a Vera Saiva mutt is found. According to the name, bomma or bomme, derived from brāhmana. This was a village donated to Brahmans, as is confirmed by the sthala purāna.in which Bomayapalaiyam is also named Brahmapuram.

The legend of this kshetra begins with the end of Surapadma’s atrocious rule and his tearful appeal to Lord to accept him as his mount. According to sthalapurana, Surapadma, though fought against Muruga with all his might combining the tactile of asuramayopaya, was routed in the end. When he was about be slain, he appealed to the Lord to accept him as his vehicle, and he would serve him with fidelity.

Moved by the tearful appeals, the Lord ordered him to do meditation with great steadfastness taking the shape of peacock (Mayil in Tamil) on the bank of Varaha near Mayilamalai. Nodding, he continued his appeal to the Lord to dwell for ever on the same hill. It was granted. Thus came into existence this Mayilamalai and the place called Mayilam, for short. The temple atop the hill was built by Pommayapuram, Mathadhipathi on a scale grand and maintenance commendable. The Mutt established at the foot of the hill is attending to the temple administration in an exemplary manner providing conveniences to the visiting public.

What does Veladasan mean? Slave to Velan.
Dasan means slave

Reaching Temple 

To reach the temple on the top of the hill we can climb by foot steps by bare foot(750 meters)  or by the vehicle (1 km or 2 km).

Shops on the way to Hill

There are more than few hundred shops on the way to climb the hill. Where we can buy holy things for pooja, holy threads, toys, hats. Even there are few hotels are there on the foot of the hill.

View from the hill

From the temple whole town will be visible.

About tonsure

We can also Tonsure. For that the we have to buy token for Rupees 5/- (INR) plus we have to pay some amount around Rupees 50/- (INR) to the person who helps to offer Tonsure.

About pond

This pond is mentioned that it is more than 1000 years old. In this pond Balasiddhar  took holy dip.

Saints

Sivagna Balayogi swamigal
Siva Prakasar

Transport

By air
Pondicherry Airport (PNY) is a nearest airport located around 30 kilometer away from Mayilam.

The airports at Tiruchirapalli (205 km) and Chennai (130 km) are the nearest airports from Mayilam.

By rail

Mayilam is located on the Chennai–Tindivanam main line of the Southern Railway. Code no: MTL.

Mayilam Railway Station handles over 8 trains daily (up/down). There are about 4 trains which start/pass from Mayilam Railway Station and are displayed below.

Train No. Train Name	 From	           To
56041	 Tpty Pdy Pass	 Tirupati	Pondicherry
66045	Chennai Beach  Vm    EMU Chennai Beach	Villupuram Jn
66046	 Vm Mlmr Passr	 Villupuram Jn	Melmaruvathur
56042	 Pdy Tpty	 Pondicherry	Tirupati
16186	Velankanni Express

By road
There are frequent bus services available to Tindivanam, Pondicherry.

Tourism
Mailam is one of the important tourist centres of Murugan devotees; in Tamil Nadu and its tourism highlights the beautiful temples in the city. While Mailam is most famous for the Mailam temple.

Temples in/around Mailam (location):
  MAILIYAMMAN Temple, MAILAM.
 Thiruvikrama swamy temple, Tirukoilur
 Vakra  Kaliamman & Chandramowleeswarar Temple, Thiruvakkarai (12 Km from Mayilam)
 Koovagam Temple, Koovagam
 Pazhamalai nathar temple, Vridhachalam
 Achirupakkam Aatcheswarar temple, Achirupakkam
 Sivapuri is a holy village located around 3.7 km away from Chidambaram
 Sirai meetta Vinayagar Temple (West Car Street)
 Kothandaramar Temple (West Car Street)
 Anandheeswaran Temple (Anandheeswaran Koil Street)
 Thagam Theertha Pillayar Temple (Thagam Theertha Pillayar Koil Street)
 Elamayakkinar Temple (Elamayakkinar Koil Street)
 Nataraja Temple (East Car Street)
 Anjaneyar Temple (East Car Street)
 Selliamman Temple (Sunnambukkara Street)
 Kamatchiamman Temple (Kamatchiamman Koil Street)
 Keezhatheru Mariamman Temple (Mariamman Koil Street)
 Mariamman Temple (Nethaji Street)
 Thillaikaliamman Temple (Thillaikaliamman Koil Street)
 Drowpathiamman Temple (Drowpathiamman Koil Street)

Other locations of interest:
 Pondicherry
 Thiruvakkarai
 Achirupakkam
 Melmaruvathur
 Melmalayanur
 Veliyanur

Education
Schools in Mayilam:
Sivaprakasar school
Aided HSS, Mayilam
Nehru Mat. Hs Mayilam
PUMS Mayilam
PUPS mayilam
Sri Ramakrishna Primary Mayilam (SRV)
B.W.D.A Nursery and Primary school
S.S. High School

Other colleges:
Srimath Sivanana Balaya Swamigal Tamil Arts & Science college
Mailam Engineering college,

Economy

Banks in Mayilam
State Bank of India

References

External links 

  Mailam the temple town (article from "The Hidu")
 Mailam: A Murugan temple at the crossroads of myth and local culture
 Mailam Assembly Constituency Map
  Mailam MLA - NAGARAJAN.P

Villages in Viluppuram district